Heriot's Rugby Club, also known as Heriot's FP, is one of Scotland's senior rugby football clubs in the Scottish Rugby Union, whose Men's 1st XV play in the FOSROC . The women play in 

The club's home is in the Goldenacre area in Edinburgh. The rugby club, founded in 1890, was originally intended for former pupils of George Heriot's School, but is now an open club, welcoming rugby players of all levels.

Player development starts with a highly successful Mini/Midi Section and moves onto the senior levels.  The club has coaching staff that are very well respected in Scottish rugby. Heriot's Rugby club are the only Scottish club never to have been relegated from the first division.

The team had the surprising honour of having a player, Chris Fusaro, called for Scotland A for the IRB Nations Cup, in 2010. He was the only amateur player called and it was announced that he was joining Glasgow Warriors.

Current men's squad

Edinburgh Rugby players drafted:

  Jack Blain
  Murray McCallum

Table

Sevens tournament

The club ran an Under 20s Sevens tournament. The teams played for the Goldenacre Cup.

Notable players
 Andy Irvine most capped internationalist (51 caps for Scotland, 1974, 1977, 1980 British and Irish Lions).
 Ken Scotland (27 caps for Scotland, 1959 British and Irish Lions)
 Dan Drysdale (26 caps for Scotland, 1924 British and Irish Lions) 
 Jimmy Kerr
 John Craig
 Tommy Gray
 Ian Thomson
 Colin Blaikie
 Ian Smith
 Kenny Milne (39 caps for Scotland, 1993 British and Irish Lions)
 David Milne
 Bruce Douglas
 Simon Taylor (56 caps for Scotland, 2001, 2005 British and Irish Lions)
 John Beattie (25 Caps for Scotland, 1980, 1983, 1986 British and Irish Lions)
 Jimmy Kerr
 Roy Kinnear (3 caps for Scotland, 1929 British and Irish Lions)
 Kelvin Hendrie
 Iain Milne (44 caps for Scotland, 1983 British and Irish Lions)
 Gavin Cameron
 Douglas Muir
 Cornell du Preez
 David Kerr

Honours
 Scottish Unofficial Championship
 Champions (5): 1919–20, 1922–23, 1927–28, 1928–29, 1949–50
 Scottish Premiership 
 Champions (5): 1978–79,  1998–99,  1999–00,  2014–15,  2015-16
 Runners-Up (2): 2004-05, 2008–09
 Scottish Cup
 Champions: (4) 2002–03, 2008–09, 2013–14, 2015-16
 Runners-Up: (2) 2007-08, 2018-19
 Heriots Sevens
 Champions: 1951, 1956, 1957
 Langholm Sevens
 Champions (6): 1926, 1928, 1937, 1938, 1939, 1954
 Melrose Sevens
 Champions (4): 1923, 1954, 1957, 1958
 Hawick Sevens
 Champions (8): 1905, 1922, 1926, 1935, 1942, 1947, 1954, 1999
 Gala Sevens
 Champions (2): 1973, 2008
Jed-Forest Sevens
 Champions (9): 1925, 1933, 1938, 1939, 1955, 1958, 1987, 2006, 2012
Peebles Sevens
 Champions (7): 1951, 1953, 1958, 1964, 1978, 1983, 1985
Selkirk Sevens
 Champions (2): 1926, 1935
Walkerburn Sevens
 Champions (4): 1953, 1954, 1979, 1982
Middlesex Sevens
 Champions (1): 1949
 Edinburgh Northern Sevens
 Champions (5): 1988, 1994, 1999, 2007, 2012
 Huddersfield Sevens
 Champions: 1951

References

Sources

 Bath, Richard (ed.) The Complete Book of Rugby (Seven Oaks Ltd, 1997 )
 Godwin, Terry Complete Who's Who of International Rugby (Cassell, 1987)
 Jones, J.R. Encyclopedia of Rugby Union Football (Robert Hale, London, 1976 )
 Massie, Allan A Portrait of Scottish Rugby (Polygon, Edinburgh)

External links
Heriot's Rugby Club Official Site

Scottish rugby union teams
Rugby union in Edinburgh
1890 establishments in Scotland
Rugby clubs established in 1890
Sports teams in Edinburgh